Larox, founded in 1977 and headquartered at Lappeenranta, Finland, was a Finnish engineering company that developed, designed and manufactured industrial filters for use in mining and metallurgy, chemical processing and related industries.

Outotec launched a €93 million takeover bid for the company in October 2009 and holds over 98% of its shares as of 26 February 2010.

After Metso Outotec merger, completed in July 2020, Larox filtration technologies are currently part of Metso Outotec portfolio.

References

External links

Technology companies established in 1977
Engineering companies of Finland
Finnish companies established in 1977